Luka Radulović (born 17 April 1990) is an Austrian footballer who plays for ASK Bad Vöslau.

External links
 
 

Austrian footballers
Austrian Football Bundesliga players
SC Wiener Neustadt players
1990 births
Living people
Association football defenders